Metro Center station is the central hub station of the Washington Metro, a rapid transit system in Washington, D.C. The station is located in Downtown, centered on the intersection of 12th Street NW and G Street NW. It is the busiest station in the Metrorail system  averaging 7,600 passengers per weekday as of 2022. The Red Line portion of Metro Center station opened on March 27, 1976, as part of the first section of the Metro system.

Station layout
Metro Center station is laid out in two underground levels in a cross shape centered on the intersection of 12th Street NW and G Street NW. The lower level runs north-south under 12th Street between F Street and H Street, with one island platform for the Orange Line, Silver Line, and Blue Line. The upper level runs east-west under G Street between 11th Street and 13th Street, with two side platforms for the Red Line, with wide corridors above the lower level platform and tracks. Mezzanines are located above the tracks at both ends of the upper platforms.

Entrances are located on G Street at 11th Street (southeast corner), 12th Street (northwest corner), and 13th Street (southeast corner); and at the southwest corner of 12th Street and F Street. Only the 12th Street and G Street entrance has a surface elevator.

History

Metro Center was one of the original 6 stations to open with the first section of the Red Line on March 27, 1976. The upper level with the Red Line opened on March 27, 1976 with the rest of the initial segment from Farragut North station to Rhode Island Avenue-Brentwood station. The lower level opened on July 1, 1977 with the initial segment of the Blue Line from Reagan National Airport to Stadium-Armory station. Orange Line service began on November 20, 1979 with the opening of the segment from Stadium-Armory to New Carrollton Station. Silver line service began on July 26, 2014 with the opening of the segment from East Falls Church to Wiehle-Reston East.

A pedestrian tunnel to nearby Gallery Place–Chinatown station has been proposed to connect all six Metro lines within fare control. A study was published in July 2005.

Between January 16 to January 21, 2021, this station was closed because of security concerns due to the 2021 Inauguration.

In 1997, Lionel-Groulx station of the Montreal Metro underground subway system was redressed to stand in for Metro Center station in the Bruce Willis movie The Jackal.

Panorama

References

External links

 Entrances on Google Maps Street View: G Street and 13th Street, G Street and 12th Street,  G Street and 11th Street, F Street and 12th Street

Stations on the Blue Line (Washington Metro)
Downtown (Washington, D.C.)
Stations on the Orange Line (Washington Metro)
Stations on the Red Line (Washington Metro)
Stations on the Silver Line (Washington Metro)
Washington Metro stations in Washington, D.C.
Railway stations in the United States opened in 1976
1976 establishments in Washington, D.C.
Railway stations located underground in Washington, D.C.